Dzmitry Chystabayeu (born 23 December 1986) is a Belarusian handball player for Permskie Medvedi and the Belarusian national team.

References

1986 births
Living people
Belarusian male handball players
People from Babruysk
Sportspeople from Mogilev Region